The 2011 European Triathlon Championships was held in Pontevedra, Spain from 24 June to 26 June 2011.

Medallists

Results

Men's 
Key
 # denotes the athlete's bib number for the event
 Swimming denotes the time it took the athlete to complete the swimming leg
 Cycling denotes the time it took the athlete to complete the cycling leg
 Running denotes the time it took the athlete to complete the running leg
 Difference denotes the time difference between the athlete and the event winner
 Lapped denotes that the athlete was lapped and removed from the course

Women's 
Key
 # denotes the athlete's bib number for the event
 Swimming denotes the time it took the athlete to complete the swimming leg
 Cycling denotes the time it took the athlete to complete the cycling leg
 Running denotes the time it took the athlete to complete the running leg
 Difference denotes the time difference between the athlete and the event winner
 Lapped denotes that the athlete was lapped and removed from the course

References

External links 
 Official page

European Triathlon Championships
Triathlon competitions in Spain
International sports competitions hosted by Spain
Pontevedra